is a waterfall in the town of Ikeda, Fukui Prefecture, Japan, on a branch of the Kuzuryū River.

It is one of "Japan’s Top 100 Waterfalls", per a listing published by the Japanese Ministry of the Environment in 1990.

External links

  Ministry of Environment 

Waterfalls of Japan
Landforms of Fukui Prefecture
Tourist attractions in Fukui Prefecture
Ikeda, Fukui